Advanced Technology Group may refer to:

Advanced Technology Group (Apple), a former division of Apple Computer
Advanced Technology Group (Novell), a former division of Novell